Pandora-Gilboa High School is a state technology prototype public high school centered in Pandora, Ohio. It is the only high school and school in the Pandora-Gilboa Local School district. The district serves students from Pandora, Gilboa, and parts of Riley, Blanchard, and Pleasant townships in Putnam County. In 2015, Pandora-Gilboa was recognized on the list of the top 50 schools in the country at preparing students of any income level for higher education from anywhere to a technical school to the best of the Ivy Leagues such as Harvard University.

Technology
Pandora-Gilboa is a technology prototype high school. The former technology coordinator was the State of Ohio High School President of Technology.  Technology used by students throughout the building includes SMART Boards, Microsoft Surface tablets, desktop computers and personal Chromebooks.  Each student from 5th grade to 12th gets receives their own Chromebook laptop. Pandora's engineering program is sponsored by Grob corporation and has recently started the Pandora-Gilboa Engineering Design group, another entrepreneurial club the school offers.

Academics
Pandora-Gilboa has been ranked in the Ohio Department of Education top school rankings list. Pandora-Gilboa has achieved the highest mathematics score in the state (as well as other categories, such as English and Science placing within the top 5 scores) in the OAT/OAA. Pandora-Gilboa has had the highest OGT scores in Putnam County and surrounding counties. The students have achieved the third highest scores in the state. Ohio Department Education's school report has been EXCELLENCE with DISTINCTION the last 10 years 
High school students have many opportunities to learn beyond the high school level and enroll in classes from institutions such as The University of Findlay, James A. Rhodes State/Ohio State, and Ohio Northern University that are all taught by our staff right here. Some Advanced Placement classes offer curriculum from IVY League schools. Additionally, students have the option to enroll at nearby universities to take classes there if desired. 
The school holds talented middle school and high school academic teams which have been very successful over the years achieving county titles.

In addition to traditional academics, Pandora offers advanced STEM and finance classes, such as biomedical, engineering, architecture, robotics, accounting, and business & personal financing.

In addition to outstanding test scores, the middle school traditionally takes home the National Woodmen of America county, region, state, and previously the national championship title on previous occasions.

Arts
Visual arts: Taught by Mrs. Ali Verhoff, students participate in many different mediums: painted/sketched pieces, to spun/molded clay, carved wooden pieces, digital art pieces, and even glass pieces.
Audical/Performing Arts
Choir
Marching band
Graphic Design
3-D printing

Athletics
Pandora-Gilboa is a member of the Blanchard Valley Conference and the Putnam County League.

Pandora-Gilboa is notable for sending many student athletes to NCAA schools (Div I/Div II) in all sports that are offered by the athletic department.

In 2010, Girls Basketball finished their season 21-3 (Loses to AP #1, BVC, and Division 3 State Champion Liberty-Benton, and AP #1,PCL winner, Regional semi-finalist Ottoville) falling to state semi-finalist Minster (Midwest Athletic Conference)

Pandora-Gilboa's volleyball team was state ranked No. 4 and was the only undefeated team left in Ohio, until their last tournament game. The volleyball team won PCL 7–0 and BVC 9–0 finishing with a final record of 24–1. Pandora-Gilboa has won State Runners up in Track & Field. Pandora-Gilboa also has many individuals win state in track, breaking state records.

After Pandora-Gilboa's men's track team becoming state runners up a new track was constructed behind Pandora- Gilboa's new state-of-the-art, approx. $20,000,000.00 school.

As Pandora-Gilboa's volleyball program advances, and sends athletes to play to the next level, the Pandora-Gilboa Volleyball Club (PGVBC) was established. The best student-athletes of all ages statewide attend practices at P-G and compete in tournaments all over Ohio and surrounding states. Check out the PGVBC website for more info.

2018 was the best year in the program for football, Going undefeated entering the OHSAA DIV VII Playoff as one of top seeds and reaching the regional finals for the second time in program history (2017 was the first falling to #1 Norwalk St. Paul). The season came to an end by a loss following a series of injuries the game before. McComb ended up becoming the state champions as they avoided P-G in playoffs by one game ( P-G held them to only one offensive TD and won during the incredible game during the season to win the BVC)

2017-2018 Boys Basketball Season ended at the OHSAA State Semi-Finals losing to State Champion Marion Local of the MAC (Midwest Athletic Conference) by 1 point, who also defeated Cornerstone Christian in 2OT by just one point, by a score of 52–54.  This was the first season in school history to win both Putnam County League (PCL) and Blanchard Valley Conference (BVC) titles, as well advance passed the regional semi final game. The team finished with a record of 27–2 (only season loss at nonconference Upper Scioto Valley by 3 points), both coach and player of the year awards in both conferences, all state and state tournament players.

Ohio High School Athletic Association State Championships
2009 OHSAA Div III Boys Track & Field State Runners-Up

2018 OHSAA Div IV Boys Basketball Final 4 (lost by 1 point to state champs Marion Local, who won the title by 1 in double overtime)

Board of Education
 Dawn Schulte, President
 Angie Basinger
 Vance Nofziger
 Kathy Amstutz
 Jill Torress

Administration
 Todd Schmutz, Superintendent
 Brad Deleruyelle, Treasurer
 Eric Vennekotter, Technology Coordinator
 Jeff Wise, High School Principal
 Jodi Schroeder Elementary/Middle School Principal

References

External links
 

High schools in Putnam County, Ohio
Public high schools in Ohio
School districts established in 1951